The Maserati Grecale (Tipo M182) is a front-engine, five-door, five passenger luxury crossover SUV manufactured and marketed by the Maserati subdivision of Stellantis, entering production at the company's Cassino Plant in March 2022. Internally designated model M182, the Grecale shares the company's Giorgio platform with the Alfa Romeo Stelvio and the fifth generation Jeep Grand Cherokee.

The nameplate Grecale derives from the Mediterranean wind, Gregale.

Announcement 

It is to be offered with options of hybrid, full electric and petrol drivetrains. The Maserati Grecale is now available for purchase in North America.

Specifications 
The Grecale will be available with 300 or 330 PS mild hybrid inline-four powertrains and a 530 PS V6 engine for the Trofeo specification.

A full electric version, to be called Folgore, has been announced. It will be equipped with a 105 kWh battery and is projected to go on sale in 2023 as a 2024 model.

References

External links 
Maserati Grecale official website

Grecale
Cars introduced in 2022
Compact sport utility vehicles
Luxury crossover sport utility vehicles
All-wheel-drive vehicles
Hybrid sport utility vehicles
Production electric cars